Giovannini is an Italian surname, derived from the given name Giovanni. Notable people with the surname include:

Andrea Giovannini (born 1993), Italian speed skater
Attilio Giovannini (1924–2005), Italian footballer
Caesar Giovannini (1925–2017), American pianist, band arranger and composer
Carlo Cesare Giovannini (1695–1758), Italian Baroque painter
Carlotta Giovannini (born 1990), Italian artistic gymnast
Enrico Giovannini (born 1957), Italian economist and statistician
Gianluca Giovannini (born 1983), Italian footballer
Pietro Giovannini (1744–1811), Italian clergyman
Romeo Giovannini (born 2001), Italian footballer

Italian-language surnames
Patronymic surnames
Surnames from given names